The Rhacophoridae are a family of frogs that occur in tropical sub-Saharan Africa, South India and Sri Lanka, Japan, northeastern India to eastern China and Taiwan, south through the Philippines and Greater Sundas, and Sulawesi. They are commonly known as shrub frogs, or more ambiguously as "moss frogs" or "bush frogs". Some Rhacophoridae are called "tree frogs". Among the most spectacular members of this family are numerous "flying frogs".

Although a few groups are primarily terrestrial, rhacophorids are predominantly arboreal treefrogs. Mating frogs, while in amplexus, hold on to a branch, and beat their legs to form a foam. The eggs are laid in the foam and covered with seminal fluid before the foam hardens into a protective casing. In some species, this is done in a large group. The foam is laid above a water source so the tadpoles fall into the water once they hatch.

Like other arboreal frogs, they have toe discs, and those of the genus Chiromantis have two opposable fingers on each hand. This family also contains the Old World flying frogs, including Wallace's flying frog (Rhacophorus nigropalmatus). These frogs have extensive webbing between their fore and hind limbs, allowing them to glide through the air.

Taxonomy

Evolution 
The Rhacophoridae are the sister group to the Mantellidae, a family of frogs restricted to Madagascar. Both families are thought to have diverged during the Paleocene, although previous studies estimated a Cretaceous divergence. Two different hypotheses for this divergence have been proposed: one that the Mantellidae and Rhacophoridae diverged when Insular India broke from Madagascar, with the Rhacophoridae colonizing the rest of Asia following the collision of India with Asia, and the other proposing that the common ancestors of both families inhabited Asia, with the ancestral Mantellidae colonizing Madagascar from India via long-distance dispersal, using India as a stepping stone.

Genera 

 Subfamily Buergeriinae Channing, 1989
 Buergeria Tschudi, 1838
 Subfamily Rhacophorinae Hoffman, 1932 (1858)
 Beddomixalus Abraham, Pyron, Ansil, Zachariah, and Zachariah, 2013 
 Chirixalus Boulenger, 1893
 Chiromantis Peters, 1854 
 Feihyla Frost, Grant, Faivovich, Bain, Haas, Haddad, de Sá, Channing, Wilkinson, Donnellan, Raxworthy, Campbell, Blotto, Moler, Drewes, Nussbaum, Lynch, Green, and Wheeler, 2006 
 Ghatixalus Biju, Roelants, and Bossuyt, 2008 
 Gracixalus  Delorme, Dubois, Grosjean, and Ohler, 2005 
 Kurixalus Ye, Fei, and Dubois, 1999
 Leptomantis Peters, 1867 
 Mercurana Abraham et al., 2013 
 Nasutixalus Jiang, Yan, Wang, and Che, 2016
 Nyctixalus Boulenger, 1882 
 Philautus Gistel, 1848
 Polypedates Tschudi, 1838 
 Pseudophilautus Laurent, 1943 
 Raorchestes Biju, Shouche, Dubois, Dutta, and Bossuyt, 2010 
 Rhacophorus Kuhl and Van Hasselt, 1822 
 Rohanixalus Biju, Garg, Gokulakrishnan, Chandrakasan, Thammachoti, Ren, Gopika, Bisht, Hamidy, and Shouche, 2020
 Romerus Dubois, Ohler, and Pyron, 2021 
 Taruga Meegaskumbura, Meegaskumbura, Bowatte, Manamendra-Arachchi, Pethiyagoda, Hanken, and Schneider, 2010 
 Theloderma Tschudi, 1838 
 Vampyrius Dubois, Ohler, and Pyron, 2021 
 Zhangixalus Li, Jiang, Ren, and Jiang, 2019

Phylogeny 
This phylogeny of the Rhacophoridae is from Yu et al. (2008):

Parasites
As many frogs, rhacophorids harbour monogeneans worms in their urinary bladders. The parasite species specialized to this family of frogs belong to the genus Indopolystoma, described in 2019.

References

External links
 
 

 
Amphibian families